Alina Speranţa Ilie Albu (born 6 September 1983 in Baia Mare) is a Romanian female volleyball player, who plays as a middle blocker. She was part of the Romania women's national volleyball team.

She participated at the 2002 FIVB Volleyball Women's World Championship in Germany. On club level she plays for ASPTT Mulhouse in France.

Clubs
  Știința Bacău (1999–2000)
  Dinamo București (2000–2005)
  Metal Galați (2005–2009)
  Terville Florange (2009–2010)
  ASPTT Mulhouse (2010–2017)
  Dinamo București (2018–2019)

Honours and awards
 Romanian Championship (3): 2007, 2008, 2009
 Romanian Cup (3): 2007, 2008, 2009

References

External links
 
 
 Alina ALBU-ILIE at ASPTT Mulhouse 

1983 births
Living people
Romanian women's volleyball players
Sportspeople from Baia Mare